Lake Mineral Wells State Park & Trailway is a state park located in Mineral Wells, Parker County, Texas. It includes Lake Mineral Wells, and is the only state park in Texas which protects part of the Western Cross Timbers and Mineral Wells Trailway. Also within the park is Penitentiary Hollow, a somewhat unusual geological feature which resembles a small canyon. It is a popular site for rock climbing, though the only type of climbing allowed is top-rope. Campsites can be found by the small lake, and up on the higher areas of the park, as well.

History
The Lake Mineral Wells Trailway follows the route of the former Weatherford, Mineral Wells and Northwestern Railway that closed entirely in 1992. The railroad was opened in 1891. Some of the line was abandoned in sections, and the rest was subsequently merged into the Missouri Pacific Railroad in 1988. The following year, the line changed ownership again to the town of Mineral Wells, who purchased the line from MP and operated it as the Mineral Wells and Eastern until 1992 when the remainder of the line was abandoned. It was subsequently converted to a trailway.

Part of the park currently pass through the testing range of the former Fort Wolters Military Reservation.

Area Attractions
Close by attractions include:
Fort Richardson State Park and Historic Site & Lost Creek Reservoir State Trailway
Possum Kingdom State Park
Cleburne State Park
Clark Gardens

References 

 Lake Mineral Wells State Park and Trailway from the Texas Parks and Wildlife Department website. December 10, 2005.

External links
 
 Lake Mineral Wells State Park & Trailway
  from the USGS website. December 10, 2005.

State parks of Texas
Protected areas of Parker County, Texas
Protected areas established in 1981
1981 establishments in Texas